Espen Henrik Skjønberg (7 April 1924 – 26 August 2022) was a Norwegian actor of stage, screen, and television.

Career
Skjønberg made his first movie appearances as a child in the 1932 film En glad gutt and in the 1937 Norwegian classic Fant, in which his mother also appeared. His stage debut came reciting poetry at the Norwegian theatre Chat Noir in 1945. He joined the Norwegian National Theatre in 1946 and became one of its most prominent figures, appearing in 64 different roles in the next 60 years. As late as 2006 he co-starred with Toralv Maurstad (who also appeared in Fant) in an adaptation of Waiting for Godot.

Skjønberg's first starring role in films was in 1951's Vi vil skilles. Throughout the years he has acted alongside Tom Courtenay, Nigel Hawthorne, Susannah York, Edward Woodward, Gérard Depardieu, and co-starred with Hollywood veterans Cliff Robertson and Robert Mitchum in the 1995 movie Pakten. In England, he was particularly associated with the Royal Exchange Theatre in Manchester and appeared there many times.

He also found popularity with new generations heading the cast of Familiesagaen De Syv Søstre (1996–2000), one of Norway's first major soap operas. In the show Skjønberg co-starred with his real-life wife, actress Mona Hofland. He was also popular as the old mountain gnome Erke in the widely successful children's series Jul i Blåfjell (1999).

Skjønberg received several awards throughout his career. Most notably the Norwegian Arts Council's Honorary Award in 1989, the Norwegian film award Amanda for best actor in 1994 (for the World War II drama The Last Lieutenant) and its Honorary Award in 2004. In 2008 he also won an Amanda for his supporting role in the movie O' Horten. He has also received the British Theatre Association's Drama Award and was made a Knight, First Class of the Royal Norwegian Order of St Olav by the King of Norway.

Personal life and death
Skjønberg was born in Oslo on 7 April 1924, to actress Henny Skjønberg and actor Eugen Skjønberg. His older brother, Pål Skjønberg, was also a successful actor and stage instructor. He was married to actress Mona Hofland from 1959 until her death in 2010.

Skjønberg died on 26 August 2022, at the age of 98.

Filmography

Film

Television

Selected theatre performances
 Ulrik Brendel in Rosmersholm by Henrik Ibsen. Directed by Casper Wrede at the Royal Exchange, Manchester. (1981)
 Odysseus in Philoctetes by Sophocles. Directed by Michael Elliott at the Royal Exchange, Manchester. (1982)
 Old Ekdal in The Wild Duck by Henrik Ibsen. Directed by Casper Wrede at the Royal Exchange, Manchester. (1983)
 Dr Chebutykin in Three Sisters by Anton Chekhov. Directed by Casper Wrede at the Royal Exchange, Manchester. (1985)
 Shylock in The Merchant of Venice. Directed by Braham Murray at the Royal Exchange, Manchester. (1987)
 Theseus in Oedipus by Sophocles. Directed by Casper Wrede at the Royal Exchange, Manchester. (1987)
 Button Moulder in Peer Gynt by Henrik Ibsen. Directed by Braham Murray at the Royal Exchange, Manchester. (1999)
 Firs in The Cherry Orchard by Anton Chekhov. Staged at the Nationaltheatret, Oslo. (2017)

References

External links
 
 

1924 births
2022 deaths
20th-century Norwegian male actors
21st-century Norwegian male actors
Norwegian male stage actors
Norwegian male film actors
Norwegian male soap opera actors
Male actors from Oslo
Norwegian male child actors
Recipients of the St. Olav's Medal